Futurecop! are Manzur Iqbal and Peter Carrol, British cinematic and electronic composers.

Life and career

Musical career
Manzur and Peter met at university, where they were enrolled in the same course. Even though Manzur was an outcast and Peter was part of the popular crowd, their love of 1980s/90s memorabilia brought them together, and they became best friends very quickly.

After graduating from university, Manzur spent all of his time re-creating the sound of his childhood. With no previous knowledge of electronic production, he used a laptop, a MIDI keyboard and Reason. Iqbal and Carrol joined to form Futurecop!. They have said Futurecop! is the discovery of life and beyond.

Futurecop! released their second full-length album, Hopes, Dreams & Alienation, in December 2013. An album influenced by angst and their favourite electro influences such as Justice. Remixes came from Lifelike, Pony Pony Run Run, Anamanaguchi, Strange Talk and Teen Daze. It received favourable reviews from blogs such as Noisey, MTV Iggy, Data Transmission and Indie Shuffle.

On 23 November 2018, Futurecop! released a new single "Edge Of The Universe" with Canadian synth-pop band Parallels on American label New Retrowave.

Discography
 The Unicorn & the Lost City of Alvograth EP (2009)
 The Remixes <3 EP (2010)
 It's Forever, Kids (2010 - JAPAN ONLY)
 The Adventures of Starpony EP (2011)
 The Movie OST (2012)
 Hopes, Dreams & Alienation (2013)
 Fairy Tales (2014)
 Fairy Tales: Remixed (2015)
 The Lost Tapes: Compilation Album (2016)
 Return to Alvograth (2017)
 Voltrana (2019)
 From Oceans Within (2022)

References

External links 
 

Synthwave groups
English electro musicians
English electronic music groups
Nu-disco musicians